Karimba is a gram panchayat in the Palakkad district, state of Kerala, India, near the National Highway 213. The largest town in Karimba panchayath is Kalladikode. It borders with Thachampara, Kongad, Katampazhipuram and Mundur (grama panchayath). Recently, it was awarded the Nirmal Gram Title (sanitation). It is the local government organisation that serves the villages of Karimba-I and Karimba-II.

Demographics
 India census, Karimba-I had a population of 14,488 with 7,145 males and 7,343 females.

 India census, Karimba-II had a population of 10,960 with 5,309 males and 5,651 females.

Important landmarks
 Meenvallam waterfalls, a natural waterfall situated 6 kilometers from Kalladikode. This is the first micro hydroelectric project that was built and operated by a panchayath in India.

References 
Notes

Citations

Gram panchayats in Palakkad district